This is a list episodes for the Japanese anime series, Big Windup!. The English titles for the first season are according to the names used by Funimation Entertainment. English titles in the other seasons are not official.

The first season, produced in 2007, was entitled . It was produced by Aniplex, Tokyo Broadcasting System Television, Kodansha, Movic, Mainichi Broadcasting System, and A-1 Pictures and directed by Tsutomu Mizushima. It was released in English by Funimation under the title Big Windup! – Oofuri. The series contains 25 episodes which aired between April 12 and September 27 on a number of Japanese television networks including TBS, MBS, BS-i, and CBC. An additional special episode based on the one-shot The Basic of the Basics was only included in the 9th volume of the DVDs.

The story follows the story of Ren Mihashi, a pitcher who was blamed by his middle school team for their string of losses, and as a result suffers from low self-esteem and transfers to a different high school. There, the school's first baseball team is being formed and Mihashi reluctantly joins as their Ace Pitcher. Assisted by his new teammates (and especially the catcher, Takaya Abe), he grows in stature, confidence and skill, helping his team excel with his own abilities. There are two opening and ending theme songs for the series.

A second season was announced in the 13th volume of the manga. It began in 2010 and was entitled . It was produced by the same team as the first season and contains thirteen episodes which aired between April 1 and June 24 on several Japanese television networks, such as TBS and MBS. The story picks up where the first season left off, as the Nishiura High School baseball team continues to compete in the High School Baseball Invitational Tournament with the aim of playing in the finals at legendary Hanshin Kōshien Stadium.

In 2011, an additional OVA episode taking place between 12 and 13 in season 2 was included in the last DVD, bringing the total of episodes in season 2 to 14, and the total for the entire anime series to 40.

Episode list

Ōkiku Furikabutte (2007)

Ōkiku Furikabutte ~Natsu no Taikai-hen~ (2010)

See also 
 List of Big Windup! characters
 List of Ōkiku Furikabutte chapters

References

Big Windup!